Arthur Eugene Milford (January 19, 1902 – December 23, 1991) was an American film and television editor with about one hundred feature film credits. Among his most noted films are Lost Horizon (directed by Frank Capra - 1937), On the Waterfront (directed by Elia Kazan - 1954), A Face in the Crowd (Kazan - 1957), and Wait Until Dark (directed by Terence Young - 1967).

Milford won the Academy Award for Best Film Editing for Lost Horizon (with Gene Havlick) and for On the Waterfront; he was also nominated for an Academy Award for One Night of Love (directed by Victor Schertzinger - 1934). He had been elected to the American Cinema Editors, and he and Barbara McLean received its inaugural Career Achievement Awards in 1988.

Partial filmography

 1926: Two Can Play
 1927: Say It with Diamonds
 1927: Ladies at Ease
 1928: The Devil's Cage
 1928: Life's Mockery
 1930: Around the Corner 
 1931: Branded
 1932: Sundown Rider
 1932: Forbidden Trail 
 1933: My Woman
 1933: The California Trail
 1934: The Ninth Guest
 1934: The Man Trailer 
 1934: One Night of Love
 1934: The Captain Hates the Sea
 1935: Let's Live Tonight
 1935: Grand Exit
 1936: Shakedown
 1936: The Music Goes 'Round
 1936: They Met in a Taxi
 1937: Lost Horizon
 1939: I Was a Convict
 1939: Coast Guard
 1941: Tillie the Toiler
 1944: The Falcon Out West
 1945: Having Wonderful Crime
 1954: On the Waterfront (Kazan)
 1956: Baby Doll (Kazan)
 1957: A Face in the Crowd (Kazan)
 1960: The Pusher
 1961  Splendor in the Grass (Kazan)
 1962: Taras Bulba
 1966: The Chase (Penn)
 1967: Wait Until Dark
 1970: There Was a Crooked Man... (Mankiewicz)
 1973: The Man Without a Country
 1974: W

References

Further reading
 An appreciation of the editing of this film, which is possibly the most influential film that Milford edited.

 LoBrutto discusses the editing of On the Waterfront in terms of the transition between styles of acting, with the earlier style reflecting the persona of the actor, and the successor "method" style reflecting an interpretation of the character.
 Discussion of the editing of Lost Horizon. The preview of the film's first cut to an audience in Santa Barbara had been a disaster, and subsequent cuts were very different.
 Piper uses a scene from On the Waterfront to illustrate editing technique. During a speech to stevedores by the local catholic priest, Milford intercut the reactions of listeners with shots of the priest himself.

External links
 

American film editors
1902 births
1991 deaths
Best Film Editing Academy Award winners